Robert Taschereau  (September 10, 1896 – July 26, 1970) was a lawyer who became the 11th Chief Justice of Canada and who briefly served as the Administrator of the Government of Canada following the death of Governor General of Canada Georges Vanier in 1967.

Biography
He was born in Quebec City in 1896 to Louis-Alexandre Taschereau and Adine Dionne. He came from a family of politicians and lawyers; his father later became Premier of Quebec and his grandfather, Jean-Thomas Taschereau, was on the Supreme Court of Canada. He studied at Laval University and obtained a B.A. degree in 1916 and LL.L. in 1920.

Following a career as a lawyer, Taschereau entered politics as a Liberal and won a seat in the Quebec National Assembly in 1930. He held his seat of the riding of Bellechasse until retiring in 1936.

Supreme Court Judge
On February 9, 1940, he was appointed to the Supreme Court of Canada, filling the vacancy created by the death of his former law partner, Lawrence Cannon.

In 1946, he and fellow Justice Roy Kellock conducted the Royal Commission on Spying Activities in Canada that had been prompted by the Gouzenko Affair.

Taschereau was promoted to Chief Justice in 1963.

Under the Letters Patent, 1947, the Chief Justice of Canada serves as the Administrator of the Government of Canada in the death, absence or incapacity of the Governor General of Canada. Taschereau served as Administrator from the death of Governor General Georges Vanier on March 5, 1967 until April 17, 1967 when the Queen appointed Roland Michener as the new governor general, on the advice of Prime Minister Lester Pearson.

Personal

Taschereau was married to Ellen Donohue, daughter of Joseph Timothy Donohue (co-founder of Donohue Inc.) and Émilie Normandin.

Retirement and honours
Taschereau remained on the Supreme Court until retiring in 1967.

In 1967 he was made a Companion of the Order of Canada.

Robert Taschereau died in 1970 at the age of 73, and was interred in the family plot at the Cimetière Notre-Dame-de-Belmont in Sainte-Foy, Quebec.

References

External links
Order of Canada Citation
Supreme Court of Canada biography

1896 births
1970 deaths
Chief justices of Canada
Companions of the Order of Canada
French Quebecers
Lawyers in Quebec
Members of the King's Privy Council for Canada
Politicians from Quebec City
Quebec Liberal Party MNAs
Robert
Université Laval Faculté de droit alumni
Canadian King's Counsel